Arnao de Vergara (probably born in Burgos around 1490, deceased around 1557) was a 16th-century Spanish master glassmaker. Between 1525 and 1536 he produced several windows for Seville Cathedral, many of which survive, before later moving to Granada.

Biography
He is the son of the master glassmaker Arnao de Flandes, who settled in Burgos between 1480 and 1490. He is the brother of Arnao de Flandes and Nicolás de Vergara el Mozo. With his brother Arnao, they worked at their father's atelier. Arno de Vergara worked on the Seville Cathedral and the Astorga Cathedral from 1525 to 1538, and on the Jerez de la Frontera Charterhouse from 1935 to 1937. His stained glass work also included the Granada Cathedral, the Casa Real's baths in the Alhambra, the Monasterio de San Jerónimo.

Related
Arnao de Flandes
Nicolás de Vergara el Mozo
Seville Cathedral

References 

Spanish stained glass artists and manufacturers
Spanish people of Flemish descent
16th-century Spanish artists